Durmuş is a Turkish surname and masculine given name. Notable people with the name include:

Given name 
 Durmuş Bayram (born 1986), Turkish footballer
 Durmus A. Demir (born 1967), Turkish theoretical physicist and professor of Physics
 Durmuş Yılmaz (born 1947), Turkish economist

Surname 
 İlkay Durmuş (born 1994), Turkish footballer
 Muhammed Enes Durmuş (born 1997), Turkish footballer
 Naşide Gözde Durmuş (born 1985), Turkish scientist and geneticist
 Osman Durmuş (born 1947), Turkish physician and politician
 Ahmet Durmuş (born 1985), Turkish technology sales and corporate strategist, Yale SOM Alumni.

See also 
 Durmuşlu, town in Şırnak Province, Turkey

Turkish masculine given names
Turkish-language surnames